Line 4 of Chongqing Rail Transit is a rapid transit line in Chongqing, China.

Since June 2020, some Express trains through operate from Line 4 into the Loop line.

Opening timeline

Stations

Phases 1 and 2
In June 2018, debugging of the first segment of Phase I commenced. Phase 1 of Line 4 began operating on December 28, 2018.

In 2022, debugging of this segment commenced. The segment opened on June 18, 2022.

Western Extension
Under construction
The Western extension of Line 4 started construction in March 2021. It will add 9 more stations west of  station.

References

 
1500 V DC railway electrification